The Te Rahotaiepa River is a river of the West Coast Region of New Zealand's South Island. It rises to the north of Lake Ianthe and flows parallel with the Tasman Sea coast along the edge of marshy ground for several kilometres to flow into the mouth of the Waitaha River.

See also
List of rivers of New Zealand

References

Rivers of the West Coast, New Zealand
Rivers of New Zealand
Westland District